These are the official results of the Men's 4.000m Team Pursuit at the 1952 Summer Olympics in Helsinki, Finland, held on July 28 and July 29, 1952. There were 89 participant from 22 nations. In the first round each team raced alone, with the first eight teams qualifying for the quarterfinals.

Final classification

References

External links
 Official Report

P
Cycling at the Summer Olympics – Men's team pursuit
Track cycling at the 1952 Summer Olympics